Rab is an island in Croatia.

Rab may also refer to:

Places 
 Győr (Rab in Slovak), a city in Hungary
 Rab (town), on the island of Rab
 Rąb, a village in Poland

People 
 Rab (surname)
 a Scottish version of the name Robert
 Rab Butler (1902–1982), British Conservative politician
 Rab Douglas (born 1972), Scottish football goalkeeper
 Rab Howell (1869–1937), English footballer
 Rab Kilgour (born 1956), Scottish former footballer
 Rab Bruce Lockhart (1916–1990), Scottish rugby union player
 Rab Noakes (born Robert Noakes in 1947), Scottish singer-songwriter
 Rab Shannon (born 1966), Scottish former footballer
 Rab Smith (born 1950), Scottish former competitive darts player
 Rab Stewart (born 1932), Scottish former footballer

Other uses 
 Rab (company), a United Kingdom mountaineering-clothing and sleeping-bag manufacturer
 Rab (G-protein), a cellular protein in the Ras superfamily
 Rab battalion, a World War II unit of Jewish survivors of Rab concentration camp upon their liberation
 Rab cake, a traditional Croatian cake
 Rab concentration camp, an Italian camp on the island of Rab during World War II
 The Rabs, nickname of Scottish football club Kirkintilloch Rob Roy F.C. 
 a character from Dragon Quest XI 
 a character from the British sitcom Rab C. Nesbitt
 ISO-639 code for the Camling language, spoken in Nepal

See also
 RAB (disambiguation)